The 1931–1934 Central European Cup for Amateurs was the second and last edition of the Central European International Cup for amateur teams. It was won by Romania, who took part for the first and only time.

Final standings

Matches

Winner

Statistics

Goalscorers

References

Central European International Cup